Kish Darreh (also Romanized as Kīsh Darreh; also known as Kīsheh Darreh, and Salīn Gash) is a village in Aliyan Rural District, Sardar-e Jangal District, Fuman County, Gilan Province, Iran. At the 2006 census, its population was 362, in 90 families.

References 

Populated places in Fuman County